All American is a 1953 American film noir drama sports film directed by Jesse Hibbs and starring Tony Curtis and Lori Nelson.

Plot
A star quarterback, Nick Bonelli is not told by his coach until after winning a game that his parents have been killed in a car crash on their way to the stadium. Angered by the coach's insensitivity, Nick quits the team and the school.

He decides to study architecture at a Chicago university called Sheridan but refuses to play football. A professor warns him that things are different at this school and that Nick will need to conform, including getting a shorter haircut. He makes only one friend, Howard Carter, and is soon subjected to hazing and insults from other students, including a fraternity that rejects him.

A seductive waitress, Susie Ward, causes a fight that leads to a rift between Nick and Howard, and the latter being placed on academic probation. The architecture professor's secretary, Sharon Wallace, takes an interest in Nick and his troubles at school.

Susie, who is candid about wanting to marry a rich Sheridan man someday, persuades Nick to join the football team. "We Want Nick" chants from the spectators precede his finally getting into a game, which Nick promptly wins with a touchdown. With a new haircut and new popularity, he is invited to join the frat.

A drunken Howard is tricked by Susie into proposing marriage. When she learns from Nick that Howard is trouble at the school, she angrily hits Nick with a bottle. He is arrested, disgraced and thrown off the team.

Nick watches the next game from a bar. Susie has a guilty conscience, however, and explains what happened. Nick is reinstated and rushes to the stadium by halftime. His play wins the game, and Sharon realizes that she is in love with him.

Cast
 Tony Curtis as Nick Bonelli
 Lori Nelson as Sharon Wallace
 Richard Long as Howard Carter 
 Mamie Van Doren as Susie Ward
 Gregg Palmer as Hunt Cameron 
 Paul Cavanagh as Professor Banning 
 Barney Phillips as Clipper Colton
 Jimmy Hunt as Whizzer
 Stuart Whitman as Zip Parker
 Douglas Kennedy as Tate Hardy
 Donald Randolph as David Carter
 Herman Hickman as Jumbo 
 Frank Gifford as Stan Pomeroy
 Tom Harmon as himself 
 Jim Sears as Dartmore Quarterback 
 Elmer Willhoite as Kenton
 Donn Moomaw as Jonas

References

External links
 
 

1953 films
1953 drama films
American drama films
American football films
American black-and-white films
Films set in Chicago
Universal Pictures films
Films directed by Jesse Hibbs
Films scored by William Lava
1953 directorial debut films
1950s English-language films
1950s American films